Bothriomyrmex communistus is a species of ant in the genus Bothriomyrmex. Described by Santschi in 1919, the species is endemic to various countries of Europe and Asia, including Albania, Armenia, Bulgaria, Czech Republic, Georgia, Greece, Italy, Montenegro, Slovenia and Ukraine.

References

Bothriomyrmex
Hymenoptera of Asia
Hymenoptera of Europe
Insects described in 1919